Clement Baker (by 1470 – 1516), of New Romney, Kent, was an English politician.

He was a Member of Parliament (MP) for New Romney in 1512 and 1515, and was chamberlain, commissioner of subsidy, and jurat of the town. He was also bailiff to Yarmouth.

References

15th-century births
1516 deaths
Bailiffs
Chamberlains
Jurats
Members of Parliament for New Romney
English MPs 1512–1514
English MPs 1515